The Big 6 Hockey League is a senior men's ice hockey league in south-eastern Saskatchewan, Canada. There are currently nine teams in the league. The league began in 1959-1960 with four teams, the Bienfait Coalers, Frobisher Flyers, Glen Ewen Eagles, and Oxbow Aces.

The teams compete for the Lincoln Trophy. The Bienfait Coalers have been the most successful team in league history with 15 championships.

Select regular season and playoff games from around the league are broadcast on Estevan radio station CJSL.

Current Teams
Arcola/Kisbey Combines
Bienfait Coalers
Oxbow Huskies
Redvers Rockets
Carnduff Red Devils
Kipling/Windthorst Oil Kings
Midale Mustangs
Wawota Flyers
Carlyle Cougars
Yellow Grass Wheat Kings

Championships

See also
List of ice hockey leagues
Highway Hockey League
Sport in Saskatchewan#Team sports

References

External links
Big Six website

Ice hockey leagues in Saskatchewan
Senior ice hockey